Bahram Beg was the 37th Shirvanshah, and ruled over Shirvan under Safavid suzerainty. Despite the enmity that existed between the Shirvanshahs and the ruling Safavid dynasty, Safavid king Ismail I (r. 1501—1524) allowed, after his conquest and defeat of Bahram's father Farrukh Yassar, the latter to rule as a Safavid subject.

Death of Bahram Beg by Gazi Beg 
During his reign, Bahram Beg appointed his brother Ghazi Beg as the commander of the Shirvan Shahan Corps, and Ghazi Beg formed an army called the Golden Corps of the Caucasus. When Bahram Beg saw that his brother had formed this corps, he thought that he had an instalment to seize the throne, so he dismissed his brother and ordered his assassination. Upon learning of this, Ghazi Beg killed his brother in the evening and seized the throne.

Sources

1501 deaths
Year of birth unknown
Safavid governors of Shirvan
16th-century people of Safavid Iran